Jet Services II was a 60-foot waterline length catamaran that was sailed across the Atlantic ocean in 1984.

See also
List of multihulls
Jet Services V

References

Individual catamarans
1980s sailing yachts